William Henry Medill was an American major and journalist who was a commander of the 8th Illinois Cavalry Regiment during the earlier battles of the American Civil War before dying from wounds after his wound Battle of Williamsport. He was also a compositor of the Chicago Tribune which was edited by his own brother, Joseph Medill.

Biography

Journalism career
William was born on November 6, 1835. The family later moved to Cleveland where he managed to become an apprentice of his father and became a journalist when he was 15. William was successful in his career as he rose from compositor to foreman in 1852 of the Cleveland newspaper Leader. Around 1855, he moved to Chicago after his older brother Joseph Medill became the editor of the Chicago Tribune to become a compositor there until 1858.

American Civil War
Around the beginning of the American Civil War, Medill left his journalism career to pursue a military career as he recruited the Fremont Dragoons which would be later known as Barker's Dragoons. The Dragoons were sent to Camp Defiance where the regiment were given mounts as well as equipment. After some training there, Medill and the dragoons were sent to Clarksburg, Virginia to keep the border with Virginia and Ohio secure. He then participated in the First Battle of Bull Run as well as the Battle of Philippi but wouldn't see active combat. The first battle where Medill experienced actual combat was at the Battle of Rich Mountain as he fought in dismounted fighting and fired his first shots in anger using revolving carbines as he managed to capture his first prisoner from Georgia after a duel between them. After showing his achievements to his brother, an issue of the Chicago Tribune stated the Barker's Dragoons as “There, those are my Chicago boys."

Medill was a major critic of George B. McClellan's tactics and methods with the misuse of his men, stating:

With later events in the campaign no longer needing the escort of the dragoons, the Barker's Dragoons returned to Chicago on August 10, 1861, and were mustered out. Although Medill complained about his military service, he was also deeply patriotic and had an intense hatred for the Confederates. Due to his previous military experience, he was allowed to return to military service as commissioned captain of Company G of the 8th Illinois Cavalry Regiment. Medill and Company G were trained at Camp Kane near St. Charles, Illinois. However some citizens of St. Charles began to sell liquor at the camp to take advantage of the boredom of soldier life. This got so rampant and excessive that there was a potential illegal citizen-arrest conducted on the city by breaking in the houses of liquor distributors, confiscating the liquor and dumping it all in the streets.

When the time came for the 8th Illinois to head for D.C., they were greeted with the cheers of local citizens throughout their march. They also managed to pass by John F. Farnsworth's mansion and held "three rousing cheers" while they were at there with the morale of the 8th Illinois being very high. They then again saw active combat at the Battle of Malvern Hill throughout several skirmishes. He was then promoted to major on September 10, 1862. He would then go on to participate at the Battle of Crampton's Gap as well as the Battle of Antietam. After the battle, Medill would comment:

Medill was also a known abolitionist, stating:

The 8th Illinois would also go on to participate at the Battle of Chancellorsville however during the Battle of Williamsport, Medill was mortally wounded by gunshot during the battle with one his final words being:

Medill died at 10 A.M. on July 16, 1863, after being transferred to a hospital and was buried at Graceland Cemetery.

References

1835 births
1863 deaths
People of Illinois in the American Civil War
Union Army officers
People from Massillon, Ohio
Union military personnel killed in the American Civil War
19th-century American journalists
American people of Irish descent
American abolitionists